Chad Williams (born October 19, 1994) is an American football wide receiver who is a free agent. He played college football at Grambling State. He was drafted by the Arizona Cardinals in the third round (98th overall) in the 2017 NFL Draft. He has also played for the Indianapolis Colts, and the New Orleans Breakers of the United States Football League.

Professional career

Arizona Cardinals
The Arizona Cardinals selected Williams in the third round (98th overall) of the 2017 NFL Draft. Williams was the 12th wide receiver drafted in 2017.

On May 18, 2017, the Arizona Cardinals signed Williams to a four-year, $3.17 million contract that includes a signing bonus of $706,288.

2017 season

On September 17, 2017, in Week 2, Williams had his first career reception, a 15-yard pass from quarterback Carson Palmer, in the 16–13 overtime victory over the Indianapolis Colts.

2018 season

In Week 4 of the 2018 season, Williams scored his first professional touchdown on a 22-yard reception from Josh Rosen in the 20–17 loss to the Seattle Seahawks. He finished the season with 17 receptions for 171 yards and one touchdown.

On August 31, 2019, Williams was waived by the Cardinals.

Indianapolis Colts
On September 2, 2019, Williams was signed to the Indianapolis Colts practice squad. He was promoted to the active roster on December 3, 2019.

Williams was waived with an injury designated by the Colts on August 24, 2020, and subsequently reverted to the team's injured reserve list the next day. He was waived with an injury settlement on September 2, 2020.

Kansas City Chiefs
Williams was signed to the Kansas City Chiefs' practice squad on September 30, 2020. He was released on November 19, 2020, and re-signed to the practice squad on December 18. He was released on December 22. He signed a reserve/future contract on January 14, 2021. He was released on August 17, 2021.

New Orleans Breakers 
On February 23, 2022, Williams was selected by the New Orleans Breakers in the 2022 USFL Draft. Williams won Week 1 Special Teams Player of the Week after a performance in which he blocked a punt vs the Philadelphia Stars. He was released on April 28, 2022.

Arlington Renegades
Williams was assigned to the Arlington Renegades of the XFL on January 6, 2023.

References

External links

 Arizona Cardinals bio
 Grambling State Tigers bio

1994 births
Living people
American football wide receivers
Arizona Cardinals players
Grambling State Tigers football players
Indianapolis Colts players
Kansas City Chiefs players
Players of American football from Baton Rouge, Louisiana
New Orleans Breakers (2022) players
Arlington Renegades players